The Langham is a luxury apartment building located at 135 Central Park West on the Upper West Side of Manhattan, New York City. After the site was unused for more than 15 years, the building was constructed between 1905 and 1907. Built at a cost of US $2 million, the structure included modern amenities, such as ice accessible from every apartment. The building was designed in the French Second Empire style by architects Clinton and Russell. It was listed as a contributing property to the federal government designated Central Park West Historic District on November 9, 1982.

History
In 1902 the property that The Langham stands on was owned by the same family, the Clarks, who owned the prestigious Dakota. The Clark family acquired the property during a period from 1880–1884 when they acquired numerous properties, including the site of The Dakota. The building is currently owned by the Manocherian family.  Located at what is now 135 Central Park West, The Langham occupies the blockfront between West 73rd and West 74th Streets. The location remained vacant until the Clark family liquidated it in 1902. At first the property would not sell because they had placed an unusual restriction on it, no building built could exceed the height of The Dakota, which stands across 73rd street. Apparently, the Clarks could not sell the site with the restriction in place as the sale deed from later in 1902 indicated only a standard "restriction on stables and billboards."

The site was purchased by Abraham Boehm and Lewis Coon but remained vacant until 1904. Architects Clinton and Russell, working for Boehm and Coon, filed plans for a US$2 million building in 1904.

By September 1906 the finishing touches were being applied and The Langham was fully complete and open for rental in 1907. The reporting from The New York Times lavished praise upon the building when it opened, noting among its modern amenities "real ice." In each icebox is an extra coil of pipe, through which a freezing mixture circulates, so that if a tenant wants a piece of real ice, without going to the trust for it, all he has to do is fill a small metal pan with water, place it within the coil, and in a few minutes its contents will be frozen solid. (Emphasis original).

When The Langham was completed in 1907, its apartments rented for $500 per month and attracted wealthy and successful tenants early on. William Brown, president of The New York Central Railroad lived here, Irving Bloomingdale, son of the founder of the famous store, moved into The Langham from a limestone townhouse when it opened. Isadore Saks moved from the Art Deco Majestic to the Langham with his son Joseph. Martin Beck, head of the Orpheum Theater chain, was another prominent early resident. He would go on to establish the Palace Theater, where Charlie Chaplin made his American stage debut. Other famous inhabitants have included Mick Jagger, Maureen O'Sullivan and her daughter Mia Farrow, Robert Ryan, Basil Rathbone and Carly Simon. The building has cinematic appearances in Love at First Bite, and in the movie Hannah and Her Sisters scenes were filmed inside the apartment of Maureen O'Sullivan and Mia Farrow.

In 2006 the building was put up for sale. A writer for the New York Sun reported that estimates of the price went as high as $600 million.

Architecture
The building was designed by architects Clinton & Russell, working for Abraham Boehm and Lewis Coon, in the French Second Empire style.

Landmark designations
The Langham was listed as a contributing property to the Central Park West Historic District when the district was listed on the U.S. National Register of Historic Places on November 9, 1982. It is also part of the New York City Landmarks Preservation Commission's Central Park West Historic District, designated in 1990.

References

External links

 The Langham Upper West Side Book
 The Langham Emporis.com Profile
The 1907 Langham Apartments -- No. 135 Central Park West Daytonian in Manhattan

Residential buildings completed in 1907
Residential buildings in Manhattan
Central Park West Historic District
Historic district contributing properties in Manhattan
Residential buildings on the National Register of Historic Places in Manhattan
Upper West Side
Second Empire architecture in New York City
Manocherian family